Vanessa Lee (18 June 1920 - 15 March 1992), born Winifred Ruby Moule, was a British actress and singer. She was known for her appearances in Ivor Novello's musicals, especially after the Second World War.

Life
Winifred Moule was born in Streatham in 1920. She married British actor Peter Graves in 1960. That same year she made her first recording, of the operetta Bitter Sweet, with Robert Cardinali. In 1958/59, she played the lead in a successful revival of Old Chelsea by Richard Tauber, along with Graves and Kenneth McKellar. A Radio Luxembourg series, which ran from 1956 to 1958 as part of the radio programme This I Believe, was based on her career.

Filmography 
 The Passing Show (1953)
 The Split (1968) as Little Girl
 Armchair Theatre (1969) (episode: The Frobisher Game)
 The Adventurers (1970) as Trustee Banker's Wife

Discography 
 Bitter Sweet (1960)
 After the Ball
 Those Dreaming Years
 Shine through my dreams

References

External links 
 

1920 births
1992 deaths
British television actresses
British film actresses
British women singers
20th-century British actresses
People from Streatham
Graves